Tân Hiệp is a ward located in Biên Hòa city of Đồng Nai province, Vietnam. It has an area of about 3.4km2 and the population in 2017 was 41,719.

Đồng Nai stadium, Dong Nai University and Lương Thế Vinh High School for the Gifted located in Tân Hiệp ward.

References

Bien Hoa